Walter von Büren (born 21 June 1912, date of death unknown) was a Swiss boxer who competed in the 1936 Summer Olympics. In 1936 he was eliminated in the first round of the light heavyweight class after losing his fight to Leslie Harley.

External links
Walter van Bueren's profile at Sports Reference.com
Walter van Bueren's profile at Boxrec.com

1912 births
Year of death missing
Light-heavyweight boxers
Olympic boxers of Switzerland
Boxers at the 1936 Summer Olympics
Swiss male boxers